St. George is a proposed city in Louisiana that was approved in a ballot initiative on October 12, 2019. Upon incorporation, it would become the fifth largest city in Louisiana and the second largest in East Baton Rouge Parish with a population of 86,316. The proposed city originates from a previously unincorporated area of East Baton Rouge Parish located southeast of the City of Baton Rouge.

A legal action to challenge the incorporation of St. George was filed in 19th Judicial District Court in East Baton Rouge Parish on November 4, 2019.

On May 31, 2022, Judge pro tem Martin Coady ruled that the incorporation of St. George was "unreasonable" under state law and denied the incorporation. A St. George spokesman said the ruling would be appealed.

Until the litigation is resolved and appeals exhausted, the Governor of Louisiana is unable to appoint a temporary governing authority (i.e., mayor and city council) for the proposed city. Consequently, the St. George incorporation effort remains in "legal limbo".

The ruling was based on state law governing "Legal action contesting an incorporation":If the district court determines that the provisions of this Subpart have not been complied with, that the proposed municipality will not be able to provide the public services proposed in the petition within a reasonable period of time, or that the incorporation is unreasonable, the district court shall enter an order denying the incorporation. La. R.S. 33:4(E)(2)(a)The judgment addressed five issues presented at trial:

 Whether the boundaries of the proposed City of St. George were drawn in a discriminatory manner.The Court ruled that the boundaries were non-discriminatory ("The perception that racism played a role in establishing of the boundaries is a reasonable impression. The perception may exist, but the Incorporators have provided a racially neutral reason why certain areas were excluded and not purposely drawn in a racially discriminatory fashion" [pp. 4–5]). 
 Whether there has been full compliance with the incorporation procedural provisions.The Court ruled that the provisions were minimally met ("...the petition disclosure minimally satisfies the requirement of the statute. The terse description did place citizens on notice of what services would be provided and what may be provided" [pp. 5–6]).
 Whether the municipality can in all probability provide the proposed public services within a reasonable period of time.The Court ruled that "the Incorporators, if properly funded, could in all probability provide some of the proposed public services within a reasonable period of time…. However, it is doubtful that [the other services listed in the petition for incorporation] can be provided without increasing taxes…. Their petition did condition the providing of some services if funds were available." (pp. 6–7)
 Whether the incorporation of St. George is reasonable.  The Court noted that "The estimated cost of $42 million [to run St. George] and the $9 million in [Unfunded Accrued Liabilities] amount to $51 million dollars. The estimated revenue for the City of St. George is $48 million dollars from the 2% sales tax. Based on the evidence, the City of St. George would run a deficit of approximately $3 million dollars on day one and this excludes the additional cost of the Sheriff. This deficit will be a huge negative on the City of St. George. St. George is required to run a balanced budget and because of this deficit there would be layoffs and a reduction in public services" (p. 8)
 Whether the Incorporation may adversely impact other municipalities in the vicinity.The Court determined that "If St. George were to incorporate, the [Baton Rouge municipal budget] general fund would further be reduced by $48 million dollars[,]  leaving the City of Baton Rouge with a 45% cut in its budget. This reduction would include public services such as roads, traffic control, the River Front, the River Center, the State Capitol and overall the quality of life in Baton Rouge. Incorporators proposed contributing $6.6 million dollars annually towards the Constitutional Offices. This results in a reduction of approximately 35% from the general fund. Clearly, the loss of revenue will have a substantial adverse effect on Baton Rouge"  (Note: This percentage reduction in the budget for the City/Parish is an apparent misrepresentation, as the total budget for the year 2022 is listed as $1.030.805,866 . $51 million dollars represents only a 4.95% reduction in the total budget, and only a 15.47% reduction in the 329.5 million dollar general fund listed.) (p. 9).

Background

Efforts to incorporate 
In 2012 and again in 2013, St. George organizers sought approval of the state legislature to form a new school district but were unsuccessful. In June 2015, organizers attempted to form a new city but failed to collect enough signatures (71 short of the minimum 17,859 required) on the petition (at least 25 percent of electors residing in an area proposed for incorporation is needed). Consequently, an election could not be called. The formation of a new city is seen as a pathway for forming a new school district. The formation of a new school district would require approval of the state legislature as well as approval of voters at the state level and approval of voters in East Baton Rouge Parish.

In October 2018, St. George organizers submitted a second petition to form a new city. This petition proposed a smaller city that included some of the same area as the original petition but reduced the minority representation within the proposed city from 23% to 12%.

In February 2019, the East Baton Rouge Parish Registrar of Voters declared that the petition had enough valid signatures (at least 12,996 required; 14,585 accepted) to meet the requirements for eligibility. In March 2019, Louisiana Gov. John Bel Edwards authorized adding the petition to the October 12, 2019, ballot.

Of the more than 54,000 registered voters living in the St. George area, approximately 32,293 (59%) cast ballots, with 17,422 (54%) voting in favor of incorporation and 14,871 (46%) voting against.

However, before the Governor could appoint an interim mayor and interim city council, a legal action was filed to contest the incorporation.

The lawsuit 
The process for municipal incorporation is codified in Louisiana state law. This law (Louisiana Revised Statute Title 33) describes the process for incorporation and the process for contesting an incorporation. The law is composed of the following sections:

 §1. Petition for incorporation; contents; circulation; required signatures
 §2. Filing of petition; certification; forwarding to governor
 §3. Governor's determination; special election
 §4. Legal action contesting an incorporation
 §5. Appellate review

In accordance with Section 4, which allows for contesting an incorporation, a legal action was filed to challenge the incorporation on the following grounds:

 Deficiencies in compliance with the law (viz., that defendants lack a detailed budget or a plan for providing essential public services, as required by law)
 Reasonableness of the proposed incorporation and its adverse impact (viz., that defendants did not demonstrate the needed capacity for providing essential public services; that formation of the City of St. George would be detrimental to the City of Baton Rouge and to East Baton Rouge Parish)
 Violation of the East Baton Rouge Parish Plan of Government (viz., that Section 1.05 of the Plan of Government expressly prohibits the addition of new cities in East Baton Rouge Parish).

Relief sought by the plaintiffs includes a favorable judgement denying the incorporation of St. George, or, alternatively, a parish-wide election to determine if Section 1.05 of the Plan of Government should be amended to allow for the formation of a new city. Plaintiffs also request that the court hold defendants responsible for the costs of litigation.

On December 2, 2019, defendants responded to the lawsuit on the following grounds:

 Exception of no cause of action (viz., that plaintiffs did not meet requirements of the state Election Code)
 Exception of no right of action (viz., that plaintiffs lack standing to file suit)
 Alternative exception of improper cumulation of actions (viz., that the claims under Title 33 and under Section 1.05 of the Plan of Government conflict with the state Election Code)
 Alternative exceptions of failure to join parties needed for a just adjudication (viz., that the lawsuit does not include indispensable parties, such as the Louisiana Secretary of State)

In addition, defendants in the case filed a motion for an expedited hearing on the exceptions.

Relief sought by defendants includes dismissing the claims of the plaintiffs and holding the plaintiffs responsible for the costs of litigation.

At a March 2, 2020, hearing on the exceptions, 19th Judicial District Court Judge William Morvant held that one of the four plaintiffs lacked standing. The remaining exceptions to the lawsuit were dismissed. Defendants in the case have informed the court that they will continue to challenge the standing of two other plaintiffs by filing an appeal.

Annexations 

Any property owner in unincorporated areas adjacent to the Baton Rouge city limits (such as those in the St. George area) can request to be annexed into the capital city. The request for annexation must be submitted to the Metro Council for approval.

During the first petition effort, several residents and business owners annexed into the Baton Rouge city limits (viz., Baton Rouge General Medical Center – Bluebonnet Campus, Celtic Media, Costco, L'Auberge Casino & Hotel Baton Rouge, Mall of Louisiana, Our Lady of the Lake Regional Medical Center, Siegen Lane Marketplace and the residential neighborhood Legacy Court).

Following the October 12, 2019, election, additional residents and business owners in the proposed St. George city limits requested annexation into the City of Baton Rouge (viz., One United Plaza, Two United Plaza, Four United Plaza, Eight United Plaza, Twelve United Plaza, United Plaza III, Lipsey's and Turner Industries). On January 8, 2020, the Metro Council approved all of these annexations.

On February 7, 2020, St. George organizers filed a lawsuit seeking to invalidate the annexations in the United Plaza area. The lawsuit claims that the legal requirements for these annexations were not followed. An attorney who represents the property owners claims that the lawsuit is without merit.

On February 26, 2020, the Metro Council approved additional annexations into the City of Baton Rouge (viz., Louisiana State Employees Retirement System, Teachers Retirement System of Louisiana and Two Sisters of Baton Rouge).

Meanwhile, annexation into the proposed City of St. George is not possible while it lacks certification as a city and a governing authority.

Adverse Effects

Legal basis 
Section 3 of Title 33 specifies that only voters within a proposed incorporated area can vote on approving a new municipality:All qualified electors residing within the area proposed for incorporation shall be entitled to vote in the special election.Under this provision, East Baton Rouge Parish voters living outside of the proposed City of St. George could not participate in the referendum on the new city. This includes voters in the communities of Baker, Baton Rouge, Central and Zachary as well as the remaining unincorporated areas of East Baton Rouge Parish.

Section 4 of Title 33, however, provides a remedy for individuals and municipalities that may be adversely affected by a proposed incorporation:In determining whether the incorporation is reasonable, the court shall consider the possible adverse effects the incorporation may have on other municipalities in the vicinity.Consequently, "adverse effects" is a major component of the legal action contesting the incorporation of St. George. As noted on page 9 of the lawsuit (Part 25):Approximately two-thirds of the voters in East Baton Rouge Parish were not allowed to vote because they do not live in the St. George area, even though the incorporation of St. George will adversely and financially affect them.

Estimated revenue and expenditures 
In October 2017, St. George organizers commissioned an accounting firm to evaluate the revenue, expenditures and budget for the proposed city. In brief, the Carr, Riggs and Ingram, LLC report showed that the City of St. George would have an estimated budget surplus in Year 1:Estimated Total Budgeted Revenues: $58,399,000

Estimated Total Budgeted Expenditures: $33,911,000

Estimated Total Budgeted Surplus: $24,488,000Given the projected surplus and methods of governance, St. George organizers claim that the incorporation will not necessitate an increase in taxes.

In July 2018, economist James Richardson and public administration expert Jared Llorens released a report of their analysis of potential revenues and expenditures of the proposed city. Their study found that in Year 1 tax revenues would be about $12 million less than what organizers claim and that costs of city services would be about $17 million more:Estimated Total Budgeted Revenues: $45,770,000

Estimated Total Budgeted Expenditures: $51,610,000 (based on City-Parish budget data)

Estimated Total Budgeted Surplus: -$5,840,000Given the projected deficit and other unbudgeted expenses, opponents of St. George incorporation claim that residents of the new city would see additional taxes or a reduction in public services.

In addition, the lawsuit (pp. 4–8) questions the "reasonableness" and "capacity" of the new city to provide required public services.

Provision of public services 
The petition approved by voters on October 12, 2019 describes the list of public services that the City of St. George proposes "to render to the area and a plan for the provision of these services":1. Public Safety services through the continuation of services provided by St. George Fire Protection District, East Side Fire District, and the East Baton Rouge Parish Sheriff's Office.

2. Sanitation and garbage collection through the continuation of services provided by the consolidated garbage service district.

3. Sewerage by continuation of services through the East Baton Rouge [Parish] consolidated sewer district.

4. Emergency Medical Services though [sic] continuation of served by the East Baton Rouge Parish Department of EMS.

5. 911 services through continuation of services provided by the East Baton Rouge Parish 911 District.

6. The City of St. George may provide the following services through contractor(s) or municipal staff:

      6a. Regulation of property use by adoption of planning and zoning ordinance.

      6.b. Building Inspections.

      6.c. Traffic signs and signals.

      6.d. Maintenance and improvement of municipal public streets and roads.

      6.e. Maintenance of right of way. [sic]

      6.f. Maintenance and improvements of drainage system.

      6.h. Animal control.

All services will be provided subject to the availability of funds derived from taxes, license fees, permits and other revenue which become available to the municipality and are authorized by state law.According to the lawsuit, the petition does not fully meet the requirements of Title 33, Section 4:

 Public Services to Be Provided. Whereas the petition states that the City of St. George "may provide" the services listed, the lawsuit claims that the proposed city "must provide" these services. According to the lawsuit, "The reduction of these services from an obligation to an option means that the petition is not in full compliance with LSA-R.S. 33:1, et seq."St. George organizers counter that: "Our attorneys advised us to say [may] because it gives us the flexibility to say ‘Hey, what's best for us?’ If the city-parish has a wonderful contract for trash collection that gets us pick up service two days a week, recycling, and it's cheaper than what we can get on our own, let's do that. And if it's cheaper to run trash collection, or any other municipal service ourselves through a private service, we’re going to do that."
 Plan for Provision of Services. The lawsuit further contends that the plan for the provision of public services, as listed in the petition, provides "an alarming and defective lack of detail." It states that the "paucity" of a plan suggests that the defendants "lack the capacity to execute the so-called plan to deliver services."St. George organizers counter that: "Fire protection will be provided by the St. George Fire Department, which is already funded by 14 mills on its residents’ property tax bill, and by the East Side Fire Department, which already collects 22.5 mills from its citizens. Police protection will be provided by the East Baton Rouge Sheriff’s Office, which is also already funded by property taxes that residents of the new city already pay. Sewer, streets and garbage pick-up are already funded by a parish-wide half-cent sales tax. The new city will provide for the maintenance and upkeep of streets, bridges, medians, ditches, canals, and other public grounds and facilities in the new city."

The lawsuit contends that the lack of full compliance would require that the petition for incorporation should be disallowed:(2)(a) If the district court determines that the provisions of this Subpart have not been complied with, that the proposed municipality will not be able to provide the public services proposed in the petition within a reasonable period of time, or that the incorporation is unreasonable, the district court shall enter an order denying the incorporation.

History

Native American presence 
After the French and Indian War ended in 1763, Bayou Manchac (originally known as Rivière d'Iberville or the Iberville River) became an international border between the British (West Florida) and Spanish (Isle of Orleans) colonial territories. This bayou (which now marks the southern border of the proposed City of St. George) runs from the Mississippi River on the west to the Amite River on the east.

Native Americans, specifically Choctaw, were known to have lived in southeast Louisiana when Europeans first arrived. In 1764, after encroachment from European settlers, the Alabama-Coushatta and Pakana Muscogee Indians migrated into Louisiana, to just north of Bayou Manchac.

American Revolution 
In 1765, the British built Fort Bute on the eastern bank of the Mississippi River at Bayou Manchac, not far from the present-day University Club Golf Course. The fort consisted of a blockhouse and stockade capable of holding 200 men.

On May 8, 1779, Spain officially entered the American Revolutionary War by declaring war against the British. With this news, Bernardo de Galvez, the colonial Governor of Spanish Louisiana, began assembling an ad hoc army of over 1400 Spanish regulars, Acadian militia, free men of color and native Americans. On August 27, 1779, they began advancing toward Baton Rouge. Trudging through muddy swamp at a rate of nine miles a day, they arrived at Fort Bute eleven days later. After a brief skirmish, they captured and demolished the fort in what would become the first Spanish action against the British during the American Revolutionary War. Galvez and his army remained at Fort Bute for six days before moving on to defeat the British garrison at Fort New Richmond in the Battle of Baton Rouge (1779). Their victories at Fort Bute and Fort New Richmond helped to clear the Mississippi River of British forces and put the lower Mississippi River under Spanish control.

War of 1812 
During the War of 1812, U.S. Gen. Andrew Jackson had the mouth of Bayou Manchac filled with earth to prevent the British from using it to launch a surprise attack on New Orleans. In 1828, American settlers reinforced that blockage with a large earthen dam to stifle flood waters from regularly inundating their properties. Although it was later suggested that reconnecting the two bodies of water might actually help alleviate flooding in the area, the U.S. Army Corps of Engineers declined to.

Historic sites 
The National Register of Historic Places includes several sites in the St. George area. Among them are:

 Audubon Plantation 
 Les Chenes Vertes ("Live Oaks") 
 Lee Site Archeological Site (access restricted) 
Ory House
 Santa Maria Plantation
 Sara Peralta Archeological Site (access restricted) 
 Willow Grove 
 Woodstock Plantation

Other sites of historical interest in the St. George area include:

 Burtville: Founded ca. 1887, Burtville was a logging town located on Nicholson Drive (Louisiana Highway 30).
Fort Bute: The original site lies beneath the Mississippi River.
Hoo Shoo Too Club: The fishing lodge of the all-male Hoo Shoo Too Club (established in 1885), was located along the banks of the Amite River.
 Jefferson Highway: The historic Jefferson Highway was designated in 1916. It runs through from New Orleans, Louisiana, to Winnipeg, Manitoba, Canada.
Old Hickory Lodge: Believed to have been built in 1814 as a Masonic Lodge, the Old Hickory operated as a private social club at the intersection of Jefferson Highway and Tiger Bend Road.
 St. George Catholic Church: Founded in 1908, the church was the second Catholic church in East Baton Rouge Parish, after the downtown Baton Rouge church that would eventually be designated as St. Joseph Cathedral. The church parish's original boundaries were similar to the City of St. George's proposed city limits, providing the area with an early sense of continuity. At present, it remains prominent in the area as the second-largest parish within the Diocese of Baton Rouge, along with its new 1,200-seat church building at Siegen Lane.

Village St. George 
Between 1956 and 1968, the Village St. George subdivision was constructed near its namesake, later forming the nucleus of the census-designated place (CDP) of the same name.

In 1966, the increased suburbanization of the area warranted the creation of the "Village St. George Volunteer Fire Department and Social Club", now called the St. George Fire Protection District. Its coverage area also overlapped with much of the proposed new city's boundaries.

Place names 

Prominent place names in the St. George area include:

 Amite River: Possibly from the French amitie ("friendship") or Choctaw himmita ("young")
 Baton Rouge: Le bâton rouge (French for "the red stick") is a translation of Istrouma, possibly a corruption of the Choctaw iti humma ("red pole")
 Bayou Manchac: From Choctaw expression for "rear entrance" (i.e., to Lake Pontchartrain)
 Essen Lane: Named by ethnic Germans in the area after a city in Germany
 Highland Road: From the "Dutch [i.e., German {Deutsch}] Highlanders," a colony of Pennsylvania German farmers who settled along the bluffs that overlook the Mississippi River floodplain at Highland Road
 Kleinpeter Farms Dairy: From the name (literally, "short [or young] Peter") of a prominent early German family in the area
Mississippi River: From the French (Messipi) rendering of the Anishinaabe (Ojibwe or Algonquin) name for the river (Misi-ziibi), meaning "Great River"
Nicholson Drive (Louisiana Highway 30): Named for James W. Nicholson, Civil War veteran and former president of Louisiana State University (1883–1884 and 1887–1896)
Perkins Road: Named for twin brothers from Kentucky who owned sugar plantations in Baton Rouge
Siegen Lane: Named by ethnic Germans in the area after a city in Germany
 Staring Lane: From the name of a prominent early German family in the area

Geography

Area 
The proposed city would cover approximately 60 square miles and be located entirely within the southeastern section of East Baton Rouge Parish, bordered on the west by the Mississippi River, on the south by Bayou Manchac, and on the east by the Amite River. Much of the northwestern boundary of the city would extend to the Baton Rouge city limits, although portions of St. George would border unincorporated parish land.

Flooding 
The 2016 Louisiana floods had a profound effect upon East Baton Parish, particularly along the Comite River, the Amite River and Bayou Manchac. In response, East Baton Rouge Parish developed a Stormwater Master Plan Implementation Framework to mitigate flooding concerns.

In 2018, Congress authorized funding for the East Baton Rouge Parish Flood Risk Reduction Project to reduce flooding throughout the parish. Using $187 million in federal funds and $64 million in matching state and local funds, the project will provide for 66 miles of drainage improvements along five sub-basins in the parish (see interactive map of the EBR Flood Risk Management Project). In the St. George area, the authorized four-year projects involve:

 Jones Creek and tributaries: clearing and snagging three miles and structurally lining 16 miles with reinforced concrete ($148.5 million)
 Ward Creek and tributaries: clearing and snagging 14 miles of channel and concrete lining ($20.5 million)
 Bayou Fountain: clearing and widening 11 miles of channel ($13 million)

Organizers of the proposed City of St. George have budgeted $2,247,000 in Year 1 for drainage and transportation.

Baton Rouge fault 
The Baton Rouge fault is an active growth fault that runs across the southern part of East Baton Rouge Parish, including parts of the St. George area. It extends from the Mississippi River near downtown Baton Rouge to the Amite River. In the St. George area, it generally runs along Tiger Bend Road from Airline Highway (Highway 61) to the Amite River. The height of the escarpment ranges from 4 to 7 meters. The average rate of vertical movement is about 3–5 mm/year. The fault has had a particularly pronounced effect near the Jones Creek Road-Tiger Bend Road intersection. Continuous structural repairs to Woodlawn High School buildings located at that intersection forced the abandonment of the property and the building of a new school complex in Old Jefferson—the first new campus that the school board built in the parish in more than thirty years. In 2017, several residents from the Tiger Bend area raised concerns about plans for an upscale subdivision located near the fault line.

Earthquakes 
Although Louisiana is not seismically active, several low magnitude earthquakes have been felt in the Baton Rouge area. On November 19, 1958, residents of Baton Rouge, Baker and Denham Springs reportedly felt a 10-second, moderate magnitude (Level V on the Modified Mercalli intensity scale) earthquake with an epicenter near Baton Rouge.

Geomorphology 
A Pleistocene prairie terrace, formed of alluvial deposits and wind-blown soil (Peoria loess), underlies most of East Baton Rouge Parish. In the St. George area, long slopes along portions of Highland Road can be seen where the prairie terrace meets the Mississippi River floodplain. Visitors to the LSU Hilltop Arboretum, for example, must drive up the slope to enter the facility. Other notable examples of terracing can be observed in Baton Rouge at the Old Louisiana State Capitol and Magnolia Mound Plantation.

Demographics
St. George has a population of 86,316 within its proposed city limits. Whites make up more than 70% of that population, and African Americans make up 12%.

The proposed City of St. George would include several areas that have each been established as a Census Designated Place (CDP):

 Inniswold
 Oak Hills Place
 Old Jefferson
 Shenandoah
 Village St. George
 Westminster

Parks and recreation
The St. George area is served by the Recreation and Park Commission for the Parish of East Baton Rouge (BREC). Park facilities in the St. George area include the Burbank Soccer Complex, the Highland Road Community Park, Highland Road Park Observatory and Airline Highway Park. 

Through BREC's Capital Area Pathways Project (CAPP), a network of connected trails and greenways is being developed throughout the parish. BREC's Blueways initiative provides paddling access to Bayou Fountain from Highland Road Community Park. Additional canoe-kayak launches are planned for Bayou Manchac and Ward Creek.

The LSU Hilltop Arboretum is a 14-acre museum showcasing an extensive collection of Louisiana native trees and shrubs. It includes a pond with an elevated wooden boardwalk and trails through more than 150 species of Southern native trees, shrubs and wildflowers. A new feature is a wildflower meadow with an earthen amphitheater. A historic marker near the pond helps to identify the route of pioneering Philadelphia naturalist William Bartram (1739–1823) through eight southern states, including Louisiana.

Education

Background 
The area's population had increased enough by 1888 to merit a one-room schoolhouse that was named Rosedale School (later rebuilt in 1895 and renamed Hillman School). A second school opened in 1910 called Jones Creek School. In 1911 the two schools were merged, forming Seventh Ward School—which was renamed Woodlawn High School (apparently after the plantation formerly across the street) in 1949 and then rebuilt under the same name in Old Jefferson in 2003.
In the St. George area, the East Baton Rouge Parish School System operates six public schools:

 Jefferson Terrace Academy (Grades K – 8)
Shenandoah Elementary (K – Grade 5)
 Westminster Elementary (Pre-K – Grade 5)
 Woodlawn Elementary (Pre-K – Grade 5)
 Woodlawn Middle (Grades 6 – 8)
 Woodlawn High (Grades 9 – 12)

In addition, three private schools located in the St. George area provide secondary education through the twelfth grade:

 The Dunham School, an interdenominational Christian school (Pre-K – Grade 12)
 St. Michael the Archangel High, a Catholic school (Grades 9 – 12)

The East Baton Rouge Parish Public School system is planning to spend up to $100 million to build as many as three new schools in the southern part of the parish. However, school officials indicate that a suitable school site in the St. George area may prove difficult to find.

Proposed school district 
The incorporation effort for St. George began with a goal of creating a new school district independent of the East Baton Rouge Parish School System.

To form a new school district, however, the new city must first be established. So a new school district was not on the petition or ballot for the formation of the City of St. George.

The process for establishing a new school district in the St. George area would require several steps:

 Win the Lawsuit: The organizers of the City of St. George would have to win the lawsuit challenging the incorporation of the City of St. George. This would pave the way for the City of St. George becoming certified as a city. Subsequently, the Governor would have to appoint an interim mayor, interim city council and interim chief of police.
 Authorize Constitutional Amendment: The Louisiana State Constitution would need to be amended to allow the new school district to access state education funds and to give the City of St. George authority to levy local property taxes. Authorization in the state legislature for a statewide referendum on a constitutional amendment would require support of two-thirds of both the House and the Senate.
 Establish Boundaries: The state legislature, in a simple majority vote, would need to approve the map of the area to be served by the proposed St. George school district. The boundaries could extend beyond the boundaries of the proposed City of St. George.
 Obtain Voter Approval: A statewide referendum would need to be held to approve of the constitutional amendment. A majority of voters in the state as well as a majority of voters in East Baton Rouge Parish would need to approve the constitutional amendment for it to become law.

All of these steps would need to occur before a new school district could be formed.

Student population 
A 2017 U.S. Census survey concluded that there were more than 16,300 children in St. George census tracts, 7,700 of whom attended private schools. Although the proposed school district boundaries and current city limits ultimately may not completely overlap, it appears that 44% of the public school students within the new school district would be black, 35% white, 10% Asian American, and 10% Hispanic under current trends.

Creating a new school district could potentially lead to the transfer of more than 3,000 students into or out of St. George.

As of March 2018, approximately 5,237 students live in the proposed school district. Of these, approximately 2,779 students (53%) attend schools in the proposed St. George school district. But some of the students in the proposed school district attend schools outside of St. George. They include 1,328 students who attend magnet schools and another 568 students who attend gifted and talented programs. Because they reside in St. George, these students would have to leave their current school and transfer to a school in St. George.

Conversely, approximately 1,374 students live outside of St. George but attend school there. These students would likewise have to leave their current school in St. George and attend school elsewhere.

A cooperative agreement between the East Baton Rouge Parish School System and the St. George school system could address this concern and allow students to attend school in either district.

Informal education 
Facilities in the St. George area that provide opportunities for informal education include:

Highland Road Park Observatory
Jones Creek Regional Branch Library
LSU Hilltop Arboretum

Media
The production facilities and business offices of The Advocate, the state's largest daily newspaper, are located in the Census-Designated Place (CDP) of St. George (but not within the boundaries of the proposed city). The newspaper serves the southern part of the state, including Baton Rouge as well as Lafayette and the Acadiana area with a separate edition for New Orleans.

The broadcast studios of television stations WVLA NBC Channel 33 and WGMB Fox Channel 44 are also located in St. George

Transportation
There are no East-West roads that run through the entire duration of the proposed city limits. However, Interstate 10, U.S. Route 61 (a major North–South highway that links Wyoming, Minnesota to New Orleans), and the Old Jefferson Highway (a once-major North–South highway that links Winnipeg, Canada to New Orleans) pass through the center of St. George in a North–South direction. The CDP of Old Jefferson is named for its proximity to the old Jefferson Highway.

The Capital Area Transit System (CATS) has only a limited presence in the St. George area. Currently the new city has no intentions of expanding CATS' services within the new city limits.

The Canadian National Railway and the Kansas City Southern Railway pass through the eastern and western sections of St. George respectively, in a North–South direction.

Economy 
In 1947, voters in East Baton Rouge Parish approved forming a single form of governance in which the City of Baton Rouge and the rural, unincorporated areas of parish would consolidate the functions of local government.

In 1982, voters approved the further consolidation of the City and Parish Councils into a single governing body commonly referred to as the Metro Council. The Mayor-President is thus the mayor of the City of Baton Rouge as well as the President of East Baton Rouge Parish.

In 1947, voters also approved the Plan of Government, which serves as the "Home Rule Charter" or constitution.

In 1950, the metropolitan area of Baton Rouge consisted of East Baton Rouge Parish. In 1973, three parishes were added to the Baton Rouge Metropolitan Statistical Area (Baton Rouge MSA): Ascension, Livingston, and West Baton Rouge. In 2003, the Baton Rouge MSA was expanded to include five more parishes: East Feliciana, Iberville, Pointe Coupee, St. Helena, and West Feliciana.

The economy of the St. George area is thus an integral part of the Baton Rouge economy, the East Baton Rouge Parish economy and the Baton Rouge MSA.

Notable people

Living 

Prominent living individuals associated with the community of St. George include:

C-Murder (aka Corey Miller): Rapper, songwriter, actor and author
Snoop Dogg (aka Calvin Cordozar Broadus Jr.): Rapper, singer, songwriter, producer, media personality, entrepreneur and actor
 Chad Durbin: Former Major League Baseball player (alumnus, Woodlawn High School)
 Rick Edmonds: Louisiana state representative
 Cleo Fields: Louisiana state senator and former U.S. congressman (former resident)
 Toni Graphia: Peabody Award-winning screenwriter (alumna, Woodlawn High School)
Julia "Hurricane" Hawkins: Record-setting runner in the National Senior Games; oldest woman ever to compete on an American track
Brenna Huckaby: World champion snowboarder (snowboard-cross and banked slalom)
 Bobby Jindal: Former Louisiana governor
 Darnell Lazare: NBA assistant coach and former NBA player (alumnus, Woodlawn High School)
Mystikal (aka Michael Lawrence Tyler): Rapper, songwriter and actor
Master P (aka Percy Robert Miller): Rapper, actor, businessman, record producer, philanthropist and former basketball player
 Eddie Rispone: Former Louisiana gubernatorial candidate and businessman
 Danielle Scott: Former Olympic volleyball player (alumna, Woodlawn High School)
Silkk the Shocker (aka Vyshonne King Miller): Rapper and actor
 Jimmy Swaggart: Pastor and former televangelist
Lynn Whitfield: Actress and producer

Deceased 

Prominent deceased individuals associated with the community of St. George include:

Edwin Edwards (1927-2021); Former Louisiana governor (former resident)
 John LaPlante (1953–2007; buried in Resthaven Gardens of Memory): Political columnist, news bureau director and university professor
Carley Ann McCord (1989–2019; buried at St. George Catholic Church): Sports reporter (alumna, St. Michael the Archangel High School)
Emory Smith (1891–1988): Naturalist whose donation in 1981 of 14-acres on Highland Road led to the establishment of the LSU Hilltop Arboretum
Valerian Smith (1926–1992; buried at Gilbert Memorial Cemetery): Actor, dentist, musician, producer, playwright
A. Hays Town (1903–2005; buried in Green Oaks Memorial Park): Renowned commercial and residential architect of more than 1,000 buildings in the Gulf South, including in Baton Rouge and the St. George area

Historical 

Historical figures associated with the community of St. George include:

 William Bartram (1739–1823): Pioneering Philadelphia naturalist; travels through eight southern states include the present-day LSU Hilltop Arboretum and Bayou Manchac near Airline Highway Park
 Amand Broussard (1754–1818) and Claude Broussard (1745–1819): Sons of Acadian (Cajun) resistance fighter Joseph "Beausoleil" Broussard (1702–1765); during the American Revolution, the brothers fought in the Spanish campaign at the capture of Fort Bute and the Battle of Baton Rouge (1779)
 Bernardo de Galvez (1746-1786): Served as colonial governor of Spanish Louisiana; during the American Revolutionary War, led the Spanish campaign, including the capture of Fort Bute and the Battle of Baton Rouge
Pierre Le Moyne d'Iberville (1661–1706): French-Canadian explorer and first Royal Governor of Louisiana; explored Bayou Manchac and the lower Amite River on a journey from the Mississippi River to Lake Pontchartrain in 1699
 Oliver Pollock (1737–1823): Aide-de-camp to Bernardo de Galvez; during the American Revolutionary War, participated in Spanish campaign in Louisiana, including the capture of Fort Bute and the Battle of Baton Rouge (1779); credited with creation of the U.S. dollar sign in 1778

References

External links
 City of St. George
 Interactive Map of Proposed City of St. George 2018
St. George Election Results (download .csv file)
Interactive Map of EBR Flood Risk Management Project
Interactive Map of Baton Rouge Fault

Cities in Louisiana
Cities in East Baton Rouge Parish, Louisiana
Populated places established in 2019
2019 establishments in Louisiana